John F. Cusack (5 October 1937-11 September 2014) was an American former politician.

Cusack was born on 5 October 1937, and raised in Medford, Massachusetts. He later moved to Arlington, where he lived throughout his tenure on the Massachusetts House of Representatives. Cusack served continuously as a state representative from 1971 to 1986. During his first two terms, Cusack occupied the 7th Middlesex district seat. This was followed by two terms holding the 9th Middlesex district seat. Cusack subsequently represented the 25th Middlesex district for four terms until his retirement.

References

1937 births
Living people
20th-century American politicians
Democratic Party members of the Massachusetts House of Representatives
People from Medford, Massachusetts
People from Arlington, Massachusetts